The D.A.V. College Managing Committee, familiarly known as DAVCMC, is a non-governmental educational organisation in India and overseas with over 900 schools. 75 colleges and a University. It is based on the ideals of  Maharishi Dayananda Saraswati. The Dayanand Anglo-Vedic education system also comprises colleges offering graduate and post-graduate degrees in areas of study all over India.

Founded in 1886 in Lahore, these schools are run by the Dayanand Anglo-Vedic College Trust and Management Society, also commonly known as the Dayanand Anglo-Vedic Education Society. Today, institutional records of the D.A.V. College Trust and Management Society are part of the archives at the Nehru Memorial Museum & Library, at Teen Murti House, Delhi.

English is the primary language of instruction, with students also receiving compulsory education in Hindi and Sanskrit or a regional language. The DAV movement has grown to become the single largest non-governmental educational society in the country, managing 750+ educational institutions, apart from D.A.V. Public Schools spread over the country and even in foreign lands, with an annual budget of more than INR ₹2 billion. It employs 50,000+ people and educates more than 20 lakh students every year.

In 2013, the Associated Chambers of Commerce and Industry of India awarded 40 institutions for its contribution to quality education. ASSOCHAM awarded DAV College Managing Committee with 'Best Chain of Schools in India' award.

History 
Hansraj Ji was the founder of the national D.A.V. College Managing Committee. 1885 the first DAV School was established at Lahore which was subsequently upgraded to become the first DAV College. In 1886 the DAV College Trust and Management Society was established and registered.

List of Presidents 
The first inaugural holder for the post of President was Rai Bahadur Lal Chand whose term was from 1886 till 1894, from 1896 till 1899 and from 1900 till 1902. Other office holders were Bhagat Ishwar Dass, Lala Dwarka Dass, Mahatma Hansraj, Justice Mehr Chand Mahajan, Padma Bhushan Suraj Bhan, Prof. Ved Vyasa, Darbari Lal, T. R. Tuli, G. P. Chopra and other. The current office holder is Padma Shri Dr. Punam Suri whose term is from 2011.

University 
 DAV University, Jalandhar
 DAV Women's University, Yamunanagar

Colleges 
There are more than 75 colleges across India for graduate and post-graduate programmes.

Professional colleges
Under DAV
 University of Delhi
 PGDAV College, Delhi
 Hansraj College, Delhi
 College of Education
 Sohan Lal DAV College of Education, Ambala, Haryana
 Dr.Ganesh Dass DAV college of Education for Women, Karnal, Haryana
 BN Saha DAV Teacher's Training College, Giridih, Jharkhand
 DPB Dayanand College of Education, Solapur, Maharashtra
 DAV College of Education, Abohar, Punjab
 DAV College of Education for Women, outside Beri Gate, Amritsar, Punjab
 Jialal B.Ed College, Ramganj, Beawer Road, Ajmer, Rajasthan
 MCM DAV college, Kangra, Himachal Pradesh
 Law
 Damani Gopabai Bhairuratan (D.G.B.) Dayanand Law College, Solapur, Maharashtra
 Medical, Ayurveda, Dental, Pharmacy and Physiotherapy 
 DAV Edwardganj Hospital, Malout, Punjab
 Dayanand Ayurvedic College, Jalandhar, GT Road, Jalandhar, Punjab
 Mahatma Hans Raj DAV Institute of Nursing, Mahatma Hans Raj Marg, Jalandhar, Punjab
 JN Kapoor DAV Centenary Dental College, Model Town, Yamuna Nagar, Haryana
 MN DAV Dental College, Tatul, Solan, Himachal Pradesh
 TDTR DAV Institute of Physiotherapy & Rehabilitation Professor Colony, Yamuna Nagar, Haryana
 DAV Institute of Physiotherapy & Rehabilitation, GT Road, Jalandhar, Punjab
 Km. Vimla Memorial DAV Physio Centre & Gym, Chheharta, Amritsar, Punjab
 DAV Pharmacy College, Mahatma Hans GT Road, Jalandhar City, Punjab
 Management
 DAV Institute of Management, NH-III, NIT, Faridabad, Haryana
 DAV Centre for Management Development in Agriculture & Environment, N-4/16, Civil Township, Rourkela, Odisha
 DAV School of Business Management, Unit-8, Bhubaneswar, Odisha
 DAV Institute of Management Studies & Research, Pune, Maharashtra
 Engineering and Technology
 NMDC DAV Polytechnic, Old Central School Building, Dantewada, Chhattisgarh
 DAV College of Engg. & Technology, Kanina, Mohindergarh, Haryana 
 DAV Institute of Engineering & Technology Betla Road, Medininagar, Daltonganj, Palamau, Jharkhand
 DAV Institute of Engineering & Technology, Kabir Nagar, Mahatma Hans Raj Marg, Jalandhar, Punjab
 Mehr Chand Polytechnic College, Dayanand Nagar, GT Road, Jalandhar, Punjab
 Mehr Chand Technical Institute, Dayanand Nagar, GT Road, Jalandhar, Punjab
 Dayanand Junior Technical School, Dayanad Nagar, GT Road, Jalandhar, Punjab
 Industrial Training
 NMDC Ltd. DAV Industrial Training Center, Bhansi, Dantewada, Chhattisgarh
 NMDC - DAV ITC Nagarnagar, Jagdalpur, Bastar, Chhattisgarh
 Dayanand Industrial Training Institute Katra Sher Singh, Amritsar, Punjab

Aided schools 

There are over 62 government-aided DAV schools across the country which are run by DAVCMC in co-operation with six state (Haryana, Himachal Pradesh, Maharashtra, New Delhi, Orissa and Punjab) and  the Chandigarh union territory governments.

Unaided schools 
There are more than 900 Not-for-profit Charitable trust run unaided DAV schools across India and several other countries for studies up to the higher secondary level. In India, they are more in the states of Bihar, Jharkhand, Chhattisgarh, Odisha.

DAV institutes outside India

Colleges 
 Fiji
 DAV College, Ba, Ba (town) 
 DAV College, Suva, Nabua, Suva
 Mauritius
 D.A.V. College, Saint André
 Dr. Jugroo Seegobin D.A.V. College, Port Louis

Schools 
 Singapore
 D.A.V. Hindi School at Singapore Arya Samaj temple, Syed Alwi Road, Little India
 Nepal
 DAV Sushil Kedia Vishwa Bharati Higher Secondary, Kathmandu, Nepal
 D.A.V. Dedraj Sewal Devi Todi Higher Secondary School, Biratnagar
 United Kingdom
 Dayanand Anglo Vedic Primary School, Birmingham
 United States of America
 DAV Montessori School, Houston, established in 2000

Related educational institutes
These Arya Samaj educational institutes are not under the DAV College Managing Committee.
 Gurukul Kangri Vishwavidyalaya
 GNA University
Dayanand Industrial Training Institute Katra Sher Singh, Amritsar, Punjab
Dayanand Model High School, Shakti Nagar, Amritsar, Punjab

See also
 Akhara
 Ekal Vidyalaya
 Gurukula

References

Arya Samaj
Educational institutions established in 1886
History of education in India
Educational organisations based in India
Universities and colleges affiliated with the Arya Samaj
1886 establishments in India
Schools affiliated with the Arya Samaj